Marianne Cargill Liebmann (born 1953) is an American billionaire heir.

Biography
Marianne Cargill Liebmann is a great-granddaughter of William Wallace Cargill, the founder of Cargill. She has two brothers, Austen S. Cargill II and James R. Cargill II.

She graduated from Montana State University.

She lives in Bozeman, Montana, is married and has two children. As of May 2015, she was worth US$3.4 billion.

References

Date of birth missing (living people)
1953 births
People from Bozeman, Montana
Montana State University alumni
American billionaires
Female billionaires
Cargill people
Living people